Lufthansa Flight 2904 was an Airbus A320-200 flying from Frankfurt, Germany to Warsaw, Poland that overran the runway at Okęcie International Airport on 14 September 1993.

Incident description

Lufthansa Flight 2904 was cleared to land at Okęcie International Airport Runway 11 and was informed of the existence of wind shear on the approach. To compensate for the crosswind, the pilots attempted to touch down with the aircraft banked slightly to the right and with a speed about  faster than usual. According to the manual, this was the correct procedure for the reported weather conditions, but the weather report was not up to date. The left gear touched down nine seconds later,  from the threshold. Only when the left gear touched the runway did the ground spoilers and engine thrust reversers start to deploy, these systems depending on oleo strut (shock absorber) compression.

The remaining length of the runway (left from the moment when braking systems had begun to work) was too short to enable the aircraft to stop. Seeing the approaching end of the runway and the obstacle behind it, the pilot steered the aircraft off the runway to the right. A fire started in the left wing area and penetrated into the passenger cabin. Two of 70 occupants died, including the training captain (seated in the right seat) who died on impact and one passenger who was unable to escape because he lost consciousness from the smoke in the cabin.

Causes of the accident
The main cause of the accident was the incorrect decisions and actions of the flight crew. Some of these decisions were made based on wind shear information that was received by the crew. The wind shear was produced by the front passing over the airport, accompanied by intensive variation of wind parameters, as well as by heavy rain on the runway itself.

Contributing to the cause was the lack of current wind information at the tower. For that reason, no up-to-date wind information could be transmitted to the crew.

Further additional causes involved certain design features of the aircraft. Computer logic prevented the activation of both ground spoilers and thrust reversers until a minimum compression load of at least 6.3 tons was sensed on each main landing gear strut, thus preventing the crew from achieving any braking action by the two systems before this condition was met.

Aircraft systems
To ensure that the thrust-reverse system and the spoilers are only activated in a landing situation, the software has to be sure the aeroplane is on the ground even if the systems are selected mid-air.

The thrust reversers are only activated if the first condition is true. There is no way for the pilots to override the software decision and activate either system manually.

In the case of the Warsaw accident, neither of the first two conditions was fulfilled, so the most effective braking system was not activated. Because the plane landed inclined (to counteract the anticipated crosswind), the required pressure of 12 combined tons on both landing gears necessary to trigger the sensor was not reached. The plane's wheels did not reach the minimum rotation speed because of a hydroplaning effect on the wet runway.

Only when the left landing gear touched the runway did the automatic aircraft systems allow the ground spoilers and engine thrust reversers to operate. Because of the braking distances in the heavy rain, the aircraft could not stop before the end of the runway. The computer did not actually recognize that the aircraft had landed until it was already 125 meters beyond the halfway point of Runway 11.

Passengers and crew
As a result of the impact, a fire broke out and penetrated into the cabin, killing one of the passengers. The co-pilot also died as a result of the collision. A total of 51 people were seriously injured (including two crew members), and five were slightly injured.

See also

Air France Flight 358, an Airbus A340 (F-GLZQ) that overran the runway and crashed in 2005 at Toronto Pearson International Airport.
TAM Airlines Flight 3054, an Airbus A320 (PR-MBK) that overran the runway and crashed into a gas station in 2007 at São Paulo–Congonhas Airport.

References

External links
 
"Report on the Accident to Airbus A320-211 Aircraft in Warsaw on 14 September 1993" (Archive) – Main Commission Aircraft Accident Investigation
Appendices (Archive) – CVR transcript, Documentation of the Braking System, excerpt from the Lufthansa A320 operating manual

1993 in Poland
Airliner accidents and incidents caused by pilot error
Aviation accidents and incidents in 1993
Aviation accidents and incidents in Poland
History of Poland (1989–present)
2904
Airliner accidents and incidents involving runway overruns
Accidents and incidents involving the Airbus A320
September 1993 events in Europe
1993 disasters in Poland